Cremonini, an Italian surname, can refer to:

 Cesare Cremonini (musician) (born 1980), Italian singer
 Cesare Cremonini (philosopher) (1550–1631), Italian professor of natural philosophy
 Giovanni Battista Cremonini (1550–1610), Italian painter
 Giuseppe Cremonini (1866–1903), Italian operatic tenor
 Luigi Cremonini (born 1939), Italian billionaire businessman